= Tianjin International Trade Centre =

Skyscraper in Tianjin, China

Coordinates: 39°06′50″N 117°12′57″E

- Interactive map of the Tianjin International Trade Centre area

General information
- Status: Completed
- Type: Commercial
- Location: Tianjin, China
- Construction started: February 4, 1998
- Completed: August 3, 2014

Height
- Roof: 771 ft (235 m)

Technical details
- Floor count: 57

Design and construction
- Developer: Tianjin Star Real Estate Development

Tianjin International Trade Centre is a skyscraper complex with 57 floors and a floor area of 190,350 m^{2}, which is at 112 Munan Road in Tianjin, China.

The Tianjin International Trade Centre has a roof height of 235 m (771 ft).

Construction of Tianjin International Trade Centre commenced in 1998 but was halted in July 2000. Its construction recommenced on 25 November 2010 and it topped out on 11 July 2012. It was completed in 2014.
